Blace is a village in the municipality of Čučer-Sandevo, Republic of North Macedonia.

History
On the 1st of November 1944, the village was the scene of a massacre in which a total of 120 Albanians were killed by the XVI Macedonian Partisan Brigade, led by Gligorije Šaranović-"Gliša", under the pretext of collaboration with the occupier.

During the Kosovo War, Blace temporarily hosted around 65,000 ethnic Albanian refugees from Kosovo.

Demographics
As of the 2021 census, Blace had 862 residents with the following ethnic composition:
Albanians 760
Persons for whom data are taken from administrative sources 102

According to the 2002 census, the village had a total of 972 inhabitants. Ethnic groups in the village include:
Albanians 968
Macedonians 1
Others 3

References

External links

Villages in Čučer-Sandevo Municipality
Albanian communities in North Macedonia